Stony Run is a stream in Big Stone County, Minnesota, in the United States.

Stony Run was named from the numerous boulders along its course.

See also
List of rivers of Minnesota

References

Rivers of Big Stone County, Minnesota
Rivers of Minnesota